Fredrika, a Swedish feminine given name, may also refer to:

People
 Fredrika Bremer (1801-1865), Swedish author and feminist
 Fredrika Eleonora von Düben (1738-1808), Swedish dilettante painter and embroiderer
 Fredrika Limnell (1816-1897), Swedish philanthropist and salonist
 Fredrika Runeberg (1807-1879), Finnish writer
 Fredrika Stahl (1984- ), Swedish singer and songwriter
 Fredrika Stenhammar (1836-1880), Swedish opera singer

Places
 Fredrika, Sweden, a locality

Institutions
 Fredrika Bremer Association, Swedish women's organisation
 Fredrika Bremer Intermediate School, school in Minneapolis, Minnesota, USA

See also
 Frederica (disambiguation)
 Frederika (disambiguation)
 Friederike (disambiguation)
 Princess Frederica (disambiguation) including Fredrika and other variant spellings